Aramana Veedum Anjoorekkarum is a 1996 Indian Malayalam film,  directed by Anil-Babu. The film stars Jayaram, Shobhana, Harishree Ashokan and Jagathy Sreekumar in lead roles. The film had musical score by Rajamani and B. A. Chidambaranath. The film completed 100 days in Ernakulam Saritha Theatre.

Plot
The story is set in a land where two brothers are popular for their egos, Kannapan (Jayaram) and Rajappan (Harisree Ashokan). They were the only sons of the two wives of Phaelwan Phalgunnan Pillai (Paravoor Bharathan).

Cast
Jayaram as Kannappan
Shobhana as Alli
Harishree Ashokan as Rajappan
Jagathy Sreekumar as Marthandan Pillai
K. P. A. C. Lalitha as Kanakam
Kalpana as Swarnam
Augustine as Police Inspector
Baiju as Amminikuttan
Paravoor Bharathan as Phaelwan Phalgunan Pillai(Kannappan and Rajappan's father)
Bobby Kottarakkara as Muniyandi
Kottayam Nazeer as Satheeshan, Kannappan and Rajappan's friend 
Philomina as Bhanumathiamma (Rajappan's mother) 
Sukumari as Gomathiamma(Kannappan's mother)
Jose Pellissery as Kuruppu, member of Panchayathu
 Kalabahavan Shaju as Kannappan and Rajappan's friend 
K.R Vatsala as Alli's mother (Cameo)

References

External links
 

1996 films
1990s Malayalam-language films